The 1932 New South Wales state election was held on 11 June 1932. This election was for all of the 90 seats in the 30th New South Wales Legislative Assembly and it was conducted in single member constituencies with compulsory preferential voting. It was a landslide victory for the UAP/Country Party coalition of Bertram Stevens, which had a majority of 42 in the Assembly.

The 29th parliament of New South Wales was dissolved on 18 May 1932 after the Governor, Sir Philip Game dismissed the Premier Jack Lang (see the crisis of 1931–32) and commissioned Bertram Stevens to form a caretaker government. Lang's government had a majority of 20 at the time of the dismissal. In this election, the Australian Labor Party (NSW) and the Federal Executive of the Australian Labor Party, which had separated in 1931 (see Lang Labor), endorsed separate candidates. The ALP (Federal) had candidates in 43 seats but none were elected. The parties were re-united in 1936. The campaign was marked by mass Labor Party public meetings including, allegedly, the largest public meeting in Australian history when Lang addressed 200,000 people at Moore Park on 5 June.

Key dates

Results

{{Australian elections/Title row
| table style = float:right;clear:right;margin-left:1em;
| title        = New South Wales state election, 11 June 1932
| house        = Legislative Assembly
| series       = New South Wales state election
| back         = 1930
| forward      = 1935
| enrolled     = 1,418,141
| total_votes  = 1,336,827
| turnout %    = 96.40
| turnout chg  = –1.46
| informal     = 30,260
| informal %   = 2.21
| informal chg = –0.04
}}

|}

Changing seats

See also
 Members of the New South Wales Legislative Assembly, 1932–1935
 Candidates of the 1932 New South Wales state election

Notes

References

Bibliography

Elections in New South Wales
New South Wales
1930s in New South Wales
New South Wales state election